The 2018 Genesis was a special episode of Impact! and the eleventh Genesis professional wrestling event produced by Impact Wrestling, which took place on November 8, 2017, at the Aberdeen Pavilion in Ottawa, Ontario, Canada. The event was aired on television on Pop TV on January 25, 2018.

Five matches were contested at the event. The main event was a Six-Sides of Steel match, in which Eli Drake successfully defended the Global Championship against Alberto El Patron and Johnny Impact. Also on the undercard, Moose defeated Lashley, Matt Sydal defeated Ethan Carter III to win the Grand Championship and Laurel Van Ness retained the Knockouts Championship against Allie. The event also featured highlights of an X Division Championship match between Taiji Ishimori and Andrew Everett, which took place at a Pro Wrestling Noah event on January 6.

Genesis was notably the last event to date to use the six-sided ring; Impact Wrestling would revert to using the four-sided ring beginning with the January 10, 2018, Impact! television tapings.

Storylines

At Bound for Glory, Eli Drake successfully defended the Global Championship against Johnny Impact due to interference by the returning Alberto El Patron, who was enraged on being stripped off the title and being replaced by Impact instead of getting his title rematch. After a confrontation on the November 9 episode of Impact!, Impact and Patron competed in a match on the November 30 episode of Impact!, which Impact won. Drake and Chris Adonis attacked the two competitors after the match until Petey Williams made the save for Impact. On the December 7 episode of Impact Wrestling, Impact and Williams defeated Drake and Adonis after Patron interfered to attack Drake. On the December 14 episode of Impact Wrestling, Patron, Impact and Williams defeated Drake, Adonis and Kongo Kong in a six-man tag team match after Patron took out Impact and pinned Drake. It was later announced that Drake would defend the Global Championship against Impact and Patron in a Six Sides of Steel match at Genesis.

Event

Preliminary matches

The opening match at Genesis featured Ethan Carter III defending the Grand Championship against Matt Sydal in a match, which featured no rounds and no judges. EC3 hoisted Sydal up on his shoulders but Sydal countered with a sunset flip powerbomb and nailed a shooting star press to win the match and capture the Grand Championship.

Next, Laurel Van Ness defended the Knockouts Championship against Allie. The referee was knocked out with a bump, which allowed Van Ness to hit Allie with the title belt and pin her to retain the title.

In the penultimate match of the event, Moose took on Lashley. A distraction by Lashley's manager KM allowed Moose to attack both men and deliver a Game Changer to Lashley for the win. After the match, Dan Lambert confronted Lashley, which led to Lashley and Moose attacking various American Top Team members and shake hands with each other.

Next, highlights were shown of an X Division Championship match, in which Taiji Ishimori defended the title against Andrew Everett at a Pro Wrestling Noah event on January 6. Ishimori nailed a 450° splash on Everett to retain the title.

Main event match
The main event was a Six-Sides of Steel match, in which Eli Drake defended the Global Championship against Alberto El Patron and Johnny Impact. Chris Adonis interfered on Drake's behalf as Adonis slammed the cage door into Patron's face. Drake and Impact battled on top of the cage and Impact tried to escape but Adonis caught him, allowing Drake to escape the cage and retain the title.

Reception
Larry Csonka of 411Mania rated Genesis 7.3 and considered the event "a really nice change of pace, as they presented a focused and wrestling heavy show, and allowed the talents to go out there and succeed. And they did, it's amazing what happens when you drop the unneeded bullshit and let the talents do their thing."

The Wrestling Revolution staff considered it a "Wrestling heavy show", with "Easy show to watch and the wrestling was good." The Global Championship match received the highest rating being rated 7.5 and the Grand Championship match was rated 7 out of 10. Moose/Lashley was rated 6.5 out of 10 and the Knockouts Championship match was rated 6 out of 10.

Kyle Decker of Cageside Seats gave it a B− rating and considered the event "a decent showing".

Aftermath
Beginning in 2018, Don Callis and Scott D'Amore were appointed as the new Executive Vice Presidents of Impact Wrestling as part of major change in the structure under the new management; most notably the retirement of the six-sided ring. The January 10 tapings of Impact!, of which the first episode aired on February 2, would be the first event to be produced under the regime.

Eli Drake lost the Global Championship to the returning Austin Aries in an impromptu match on the February 1 episode of Impact!. On the February 8 episode of Impact!, Johnny Impact became the #1 contender to the Global Championship by defeating Alberto El Patron, Ethan Carter III and Moose in a four-way match. Aries successfully defended the title against Drake in a rematch on the February 15 episode of Impact!. Impact would receive his title shot against Aries on the Crossroads special edition of Impact! on March 8, where Aries retained the title. Alberto El Patron had a staredown with Aries after the match, setting up a title match between the two for Aries' title at the Redemption pay-per-view.

The feud between Laurel Van Ness and Allie continued as Allie cost Van Ness, a non-title match against the debuting Kiera Hogan on the February 1 episode of Impact Wrestling. Allie defeated Van Ness in a rematch to capture the Knockouts Championship at Crossroads. This would be Van Ness' last match in Impact Wrestling as she left the promotion after the title loss, thus marking the end of their feud.

On the February 22 episode of Impact!, the Grand Champion Matt Sydal revealed that he was following the guidance of a spiritual guru and challenged the X Division Champion Taiji Ishimori to a title versus title match at Crossroads, which Sydal won thus becoming a double champion. Sydal would award the Grand Championship to his spiritual guru Josh Matthews on the March 15 episode of Impact!. He defended the title against the World Champion Austin Aries on Matthews' behalf in a title vs. title match, which Aries won, thus becoming a double champion in his own right.

Lashley ended his feud with American Top Team by defeating KM on the February 1 episode of Impact!. He would then briefly feud with oVe until the newcomer Brian Cage replaced the injured Eddie Edwards and became Lashley's tag team partner for a match against oVe at Crossroads, which Cage and Lashley won. Lashley would then compete against Cage in a losing effort in his final match in Impact Wrestling on the March 29 episode of Impact!.

Results

See also
2018 in professional wrestling
List of Impact! special episodes

References

External links
Genesis 2018 official website 

Impact Wrestling Genesis
2017 in professional wrestling
November 2017 events in Canada
2018 American television episodes
2010s American television specials
Professional wrestling in Ontario
2017 in Ontario
Events in Ottawa